is a Chinese musician and jinghu player.

Discography

Singles

Participated works

References

External links
 
 

1963 births
Living people
Musicians from Nanjing
20th-century Chinese  male singers
20th-century Chinese male actors
Chinese male Peking opera actors
Female impersonators in Peking opera
Chinese emigrants to Japan
21st-century Chinese male singers
21st-century Chinese male actors
Avex Group artists
Male actors from Nanjing